Jakub Jankto (born 19 January 1996) is a Czech professional footballer who plays as a midfielder for Czech First League club Sparta Prague, on loan from La Liga club Getafe, and the Czech Republic national team.

Club career
Jankto signed for Udinese from Slavia Prague in 2014 for a reported fee of €700,000. Without making his league debut for the team, he went on loan to Serie B side Ascoli in 2015.

He made his career league debut for Ascoli on 15 September 2015 in a Serie B 1–0 home win against Virtus Entella.

On 6 July 2018, Sampdoria announced that Jankto had joined the club on an initial loan deal with an obligation to make the transfer permanent for €15 million. On 12 August 2018, Jankto scored on his debut for Sampdoria in a 1–0 Coppa Italia win against Viterbese. Sampdoria later made the transfer permanent.

On 20 August 2021, Jankto signed a two-year contract with La Liga club Getafe CF. On 10 August of the following year, he returned to his home country after joining Sparta Prague on a one-year loan deal.

Personal life
Jankto was in a relationship with model Markéta Ottomanská and they had a son. They separated in 2021. On 13 February 2023, Jankto publicly came out as gay in a social media statement, becoming the first active senior international in men's football to do so. Jankto's move received support from football clubs, footballers and other athletes.

Career statistics

Club

International

Scores and results list Czech Republic's goal tally first, score column indicates score after each Jankto goal.

References

External links

 
 Jakub Jankto official international statistics
 

1996 births
Living people
Footballers from Prague
Czech footballers
Czech Republic youth international footballers
Czech Republic under-21 international footballers
Czech Republic international footballers
Association football midfielders
SK Slavia Prague players
Udinese Calcio players
Ascoli Calcio 1898 F.C. players
U.C. Sampdoria players
Getafe CF footballers
AC Sparta Prague players
Serie A players
Serie B players
UEFA Euro 2020 players
Czech expatriate footballers
Expatriate footballers in Italy
Expatriate footballers in Spain
Czech expatriate sportspeople in Italy
Czech expatriate sportspeople in Spain
LGBT association football players
Gay sportsmen
Czech gay men
Czech LGBT sportspeople
21st-century Czech LGBT people